Châu Thành is a rural district (huyện) of Long An province in the Mekong River Delta region of Vietnam. It is the birthplace of former Army of the Republic of Vietnam general Trần Thiện Khiêm. As of 2003 the district had a population of 102,409. The district covers an area of 151 km². The district capital lies at Tầm Vu.

References

Districts of Long An province